The Jair Bolsonaro 2022 presidential campaign was officialized on 24 July 2022 in Rio de Janeiro. His running mate is former Minister of Defence Walter Braga Netto. Incumbent president Jair Bolsonaro, elected in 2018 for the first term, is a candidate for re-election for the second term.

Background
On 26 June 2022, President Jair Bolsonaro (PL) announced in an interview in Jovem Pan News program Programa 4x4 that he would nominate Walter Braga Netto (PL) as his running mate for the 2022 presidential election. On 24 July 2022, the Liberal Party confirmed both Bolsonaro and Braga Netto candidacies. It was held in Maracanãzinho Gymnasium, North Side of Rio de Janeiro.

Campaign
On 8 August, Bolsonaro was interviewed in Flow Podcast, where he criticized the Supreme Federal Court and Petrobras. The streaming reached a peak of more than 558,000 viewers.

Endorsements

Brazilian Politicians 
Reinaldo Azambuja, Governor of Mato Grosso do Sul (second round)
Flávio Bolsonaro, Senator for Rio de Janeiro & eldest son of Jair Bolsonaro
Ronaldo Caiado, Governor of Goiás (second round)
Gladson Cameli, Governor of Acre
Cláudio Castro, Governor of Rio de Janeiro
Fernando Collor, 32nd President of Brazil & Senator for Alagoas
Eduardo Cunha, former President of the Chamber of Deputies (2015-2016)
Deltan Dallagnol, Federal Deputy-elect from Paraná and former lead prosecutor of Operation Car Wash
Antonio Denarium, Governor of Roraima
Wellington Fagundes, Senator for Mato Grosso
Mário Frias, Federal Deputy from São Paulo (assumes in 2023) and actor
Rodrigo Garcia, Governor of São Paulo (second round)
Eduardo Girão, Senator for Ceará
Marcel van Hattem, Federal Deputy from Rio Grande do Sul
Fernando Holiday, City Counselor of São Paulo (second round)
 Ratinho Júnior, Governor of Paraná
Wilson Lima, Governor of Amazonas (second round)
Zequinha Marinho, Senator for Pará
Mauro Mendes, Governor of Mato Grosso
Sergio Moro, Former Federal Judge and Senator-elect for Paraná
Luiz Philippe of Orléans-Braganza, politician and former ruling House of Orléans-Braganza (second round)
Carlos Portinho, Senator for Rio de Janeiro
Ibaneis Rocha, Governor of the Federal District (second round)
Marcos Rogério, Senator for Rondônia
Romário, Senator for Rio de Janeiro and former professional footballer
Carlos Viana, Senator for Minas Gerais
Romeu Zema, Governor of Minas Gerais

International Politicians and activists 
Santiago Abascal, Spanish politician
María Fernanda Cabal, Colombian Senator
Juan Guaidó, Venezuelan politician
Jose Antonio Kast, Chilean politician
Javier Milei, Argentine economist and politician
Benjamin Netanyahu, Former Israeli Prime Minister
Malik Obama, Kenyan-American businessman, politician, and older half-brother of Barack Obama (second round)
Viktor Orban, Hungarian Prime Minister
Donald Trump, 45th President of the United States
Donald Trump Jr., political activist and son of Donald Trump
André Ventura, Portuguese politician

Athletes 
José Aldo, professional MMA fighter
Dani Alves, professional footballer
Rafael dos Anjos, professional mixed martial artist
Vitor Belfort, professional mixed martial artist 
Bruno, professional footballer
Romero Cavalcanti, Brazilian Jiu-Jitsu master and the founder of Alliance Jiu Jitsu (second round)
Júlio César, professional footballer
Ana Paula Connelly, professional volleyball player
Paulo Costa, professional mixed martial artist
Cris Cyborg, professional mixed martial artist
Dagoberto, professional footballer
Ederson, professional footballer
Falcão, professional futsal player
Acelino Freitas, former professional boxer
Emerson Fittipaldi, former Formula One and Indianapolis 500 champion
Renato Gaucho, professional football coach
Royce Gracie, retired professional mixed martial artist
Fábio Gurgel, 4x World Jiu-Jitsu Champion
Marcos, professional footballer
Felipe Melo, professional footballer
Lucas Moura, professional footballer
Nenê, professional basketballer
Neymar, professional footballer
Natália Pereira, professional volleyball player
Nelson Piquet, former racecar driver
Rafael, professional footballer
Rivaldo, professional footballer
Robinho, professional footballer
Ronaldinho, professional footballer
Maurício Rua, professional mixed martial artist
Thiago Santos, professional mixed martial artist
Thiago Silva, professional footballer
Wanderlei Silva, professional mixed martial artist
Wallace de Souza, professional volleyball player
Maurício Souza, professional volleyball player
João Victor, professional footballer
Fabrício Werdum, professional mixed martial artist

Celebrities 
Patricia Abravanel, television presenter
Amado Batista, singer
Zezé Di Camargo, singer
Nana Caymmi, singer
Regina Duarte, actress
Chitãozinho, singer
Leonardo, singer
Bruno, singer
Fernando & Sorocaba, Sertanejo duo
Felipe Folgosi, actor
Latino, singer
Gusttavo Lima, singer
Mario Vargas Llosa, Peruvian novelist 
Silas Malafaia, televangelist
Humberto Martins, actor
Marrone, singer
Sula Miranda, singer
Netinho, singer
Ratinho, television presenter
Sérgio Reis, singer
Malvino Salvador, actor
Andressa Urach, model
Ana Paula Valadão, gospel singer (second round)

Business 
Luciano Hang, entrepreneur, co-founder of the Havan department store chain
Roberto Justus, investor & businessman (second round)
Flávio Rocha, CEO and Chairman of Lojas Riachuelo
Silvio Santos, media tycoon, founder of SBT & TV presenter

Journalism 
Tiago Leifert, journalist and television presenter
Leda Nagle, journalist and television presenter

Candidates

The following politicians announced their candidacy. The political parties had up to 15 August 2022 to formally register their candidates.

Election result

See also
 Bolsonarism
 Jair Bolsonaro 2018 presidential campaign
 2018 Brazilian general election
 Lula da Silva 2022 presidential campaign
 Simone Tebet 2022 presidential campaign

References

External links
 
 
 

2022 in Brazilian politics
2022 Brazilian presidential campaigns
Jair Bolsonaro